The Akwa Ibom State Ministry of Culture and Tourism is the state's government branch or ministry, responsible for planning, devising and implementing the state's strategy on Culture and Tourism.

The Ministry is headed by the Commissioner charged with overseeing the activities of the ministry.

See also 
 List Of Government Ministries Of Akwa Ibom State
 Akwa Ibom State Government

References 

Government ministries of Akwa Ibom State
Akwa Ibom
Akwa Ibom